The 2017 U.S. Men's Clay Court Championships (also known as the Fayez Sarofim & Co. U.S. Men's Clay Court Championships for sponsorship purposes) was a tennis tournament played on outdoor clay courts. It was 49th edition of the U.S. Men's Clay Court Championships, and an ATP World Tour 250 event on the 2017 ATP World Tour. It took place at River Oaks Country Club in Houston, Texas, United States, from April 10 through April 16, 2017.

Singles main draw entrants

Seeds

Rankings are as of April 3, 2017.

Other entrants
The following players received wildcards into the main draw:
  Ernesto Escobedo
  Bjorn Fratangelo 
  Reilly Opelka

The following player using a protected ranking into the singles main draw:
  Tommy Haas

The following players received entry via the qualifying draw:
  Máximo González 
  Leonardo Mayer
  Noah Rubin 
  Tennys Sandgren

Withdrawals
Before the tournament
  Adrian Mannarino → replaced by  Nicolás Kicker

Retirements
  Noah Rubin

Doubles main draw entrants

Seeds

 Rankings are as of April 3, 2017.

Other entrants
The following pairs received wildcards into the doubles main draw:
  Dustin Brown /  Frances Tiafoe
  Máximo González /  Juan Mónaco

The following pair received entry as alternates:
  Jared Donaldson /  Thiago Monteiro

Withdrawals
Before the tournament
  Brian Baker

Champions

Singles

  Steve Johnson def.  Thomaz Bellucci, 6–4, 4–6, 7–6(7–5)

Doubles

  Julio Peralta /  Horacio Zeballos def.  Dustin Brown /  Frances Tiafoe, 4–6, 7–5, [10–6]

References

External links

Official website